This is intended to be as full a list as possible of country houses, castles, palaces, other stately homes, and manor houses in the United Kingdom and the Channel Islands; any architecturally notable building which has served as a residence for a significant family or a notable figure in history. The list includes smaller castles, abbeys and priories that were converted into a private residence, and also buildings now within urban areas which retain some of their original character, whether now with or without extensive gardens.

England

Bedfordshire

 Ampthill Park
 Aspley House
 Battlesden House
 Blunham House
 Bozunes Manor
 Bow Brickhill Manor
 Bromham Manor
 Bushmead Priory
 Caddington Hall (demolished 1975)
 Caldecott Manor
 Campton Manor
 Cardington Manor
 Chicksands Priory
 Clophill Manor
 Colworth House
 Cranfield Court (demolished 1934)
 Eaton Manor
 Edworth Manor
 Eggington House
 Elstow Moot Hall
 Flitwick Manor
 Goldington Bury (demolished 1964)
 Harlington Manor
 Harrold Hall (demolished 1961)
 Haynes Park
 Hinwick House
 Hockcliffe Manor
 Houghton House (ruined)
 Ickwell Bury (demolished 1937)
 Luton Hoo
 Milton Ernest Hall
 Moggerhanger House
 Moreteyne Manor
 Odell Castle
 Pavenham Manor (demolished 1960)
 Potton Manor
 Ragons Manor
 Sandy Manor
 Shortmead House
 Silsoe Manor
 Someries Castle (ruined)
 Southill Park
 Stockwood Park (demolished 1964)
 The Mansion House, Old Warden Park
 Toddington Manor
 Turvey Abbey
 Turvey House
 Wardon Manor
 Wavendon Hall
 Willington Manor
 Woburn Abbey
 Wodhull Manor
 Woodcroft Manor
 Woodland Manor Hotel
 Wootton House
 Wrest Park

Berkshire

 Aldermaston Court
 Aldin House
 Ascot Heath House
 Ascot Place
 Basildon Park
 Bearwood House
 Beaumont College
 Benham Park
 Berkshire College of Agriculture
 Berystede
 Billingbear House (demolished)
 Bisham Abbey
 Bucklebury Manor
 Bulmershe Court (demolished)
 Calcot Park
 Caversham Court
 Caversham Park
 Cippenham Moat
 Coley Park
 Coworth House
 Cranbourne Lodge
 Cumberland Lodge
 Deanery Garden
 Denford Park
 Ditton Park
 Donnington Grove
 Easthampstead Park
 Elcot Park Hotel
 Englefield House
 Farley Hall
 Farley Castle
 Foxhill House
 Frogmore House
 Haines Hill
 Hungerford Park
 Oakley Court
 Ockwells
 Padworth College
 Park Place
 Prospect Park
 Great House at Sonning
 Royal Berkshire Hotel
 Royal Lodge
 St Gabriel's School
 Shaw House
 Shottesbrooke Park
 Silwood Park
 Sonning Bishop's Palace
 South Hill Park
 St Cassian's Centre
 Stanlake Park
 Sulhamstead House
 Sunningdale Park
 Sunninghill Park
 Swallowfield Park
 Swinley Park
 Tittenhurst Park
 Ufton Court
 Welford Park
 Windsor Castle
 Wokefield Park

City of Bristol

 Blaise Castle
 Burfleld House (demolished)
 Clifton Hill House
 The Dower House, Stoke Park
 Engineers House
 Goldney Hall
 Kings Weston House
 Long Fox Manor (formerly Brislington House)
 Merchant Hall
 Red Lodge Museum
 Royal Fort House

Buckinghamshire

 The Abbey, Aston Abbotts
 Ascott House
 Aston Clinton House
 Biddlesden Park
 Bletchley Park
 Boarstall Tower
 Bulstrode Park
 Chalfont Park
 Chenies Manor House
 Chequers
 Chicheley Hall
 Cholesbury Manor House
 Claydon House
 Cliveden
 Coppins
 Danesfield House
 Ditton Park
 Dorney Court
 Dorneywood
 Dorton House
 Dropmore Park
 Eythrope
 Fawley Court
 Gayhurst House
 The Grange, Chalfont St Peter (demolished)
 Greenlands
 Halton House
 Hampden House
 Harleyford Manor
 Hartwell House
 Hedsor House
 Horwood House
 Hughenden Manor
 Iver Grove
 Marlow Place
 Mentmore Towers
 Milton's Cottage
 Missenden Abbey
 Nether Winchendon House
 Newland Park
 Notley Abbey
 Remnantz
 Shardeloes
 Stowe House
 Taplow Court
 Tyringham Hall
 Waddesdon Manor
 West Wycombe Park
 Wilton Park House (demolished)
 Winslow Hall
 Wormsley Park
 Wotton House
 Wycombe Abbey

Cambridgeshire

 Anglesey Abbey
 Bourn Hall
 Buckden Towers
 Burghley House
 Cheriton House
 Cherry Hinton Hall
 Chippenham Park
 Elton Hall
 Farm Hall
 Gaynes Hall
 Harston House
Haslingfield Hall
 Hinchingbrooke House
 Holmewood Hall
 Island Hall
 Kimbolton Castle
 Leverington Hall
 Longthorpe Tower
Madingley Hall
 The Manor
 Marshall House, Cambridge
 Milton Hall
 Northborough Castle
 Peckover House and Garden
 Quy Hall
 Sawston Hall
 Spinney Abbey
 Thorney Abbey House
 Thorpe Hall
 Toft Country House Hotel
 Toseland Hall
 Ufford Hall
 Walcot Hall
 Wimpole Hall
 Woodcroft Castle

Cheshire

 Adlington Hall
 Alderley Old Hall
 Alderley Park
 Aldford Hall
 Alvanley Hall
 Antrobus Hall
 Arley Hall
 Ashley Hall
 Aston Park
 Austerson Old Hall
 Bache Hall
 Backford Hall
 Baddiley Hall
 Barrow Hall
 Bear and Billet
 Beeston Towers
 Belgrave Lodge
 Belmont Hall
 Betchton Hall
 Bexton Hall
 Birtles Hall
 Blackden Hall
 Blackden Manor
 Bolesworth Castle
 Bonis Hall
 Booth Mansion
 Bostock Hall
 Boughton Hall
 Brereton Hall
 Broxton Old Hall
 Buglawton Hall
 Bulkeley Grange
 Bulkeley Hall
 Burton Hall
 Burton Manor
 Butley Hall
 Calveley Hall
 Capesthorne Hall
 Castle Park House
 Checkley Hall
 Chelford Manor House
 The Falcon, Chester
 Cholmondeley Castle
 Chorley Old Hall
 Chorlton Hall, Backford
 Chorlton Hall, Malpas
 Chorlton Old Hall
 Christleton Hall
 Christleton Old Hall
 Churche's Mansion
 Churton Hall
 Clonterbrook House
 Cogshall Hall
 Colshaw Hall
 Combermere Abbey
 Cowper House
 Crabwall Hall
 Crag Hall
 Cranage Hall
 Crewe Hall
 Crewe Hill
 Crewood Hall
 Abbotsford
 Daresbury Hall
 Davenham Hall
 Dee Hills House
 Doddington Hall
 Dorfold Hall
 Duddon Old Hall
 Dukenfield Hall
 Eaton Hall
 Eccleston Hill
 Eccleston Paddocks
 Edge Hall
 Endon Hall
 Fulshaw Hall
 Gamul House
 Gawsworth New Hall
 Gawsworth Old Hall
 Gawsworth Old Rectory
 God's Providence House
 Great Moreton Hall
 Green Paddocks
 Greenbank
 Hallwood
 Halton Old Hall
 Hampton Old Hall
 Handforth Hall
 Hankelow Hall
 Hapsford Hall
 Hare Hill
 Hartford Manor
 Haslington Hall
 Hassall Hall
 Haughton Hall
 Hawthorn Hall
 Heawood Hall
 Hefferston Grange
 Henbury Hall
 Higher Hall
 Higher Huxley Hall
 Highfields
 Hinderton Hall
 Hockenhull Hall
 Holford Hall
 Hollin Old Hall
 Hoole Hall
 Hough Hole House
 Hulme Hall
 Hurdsfield House
 Ingersley Hall
 Inglewood
 Jodrell Hall
 Langley Hall
 Lawton Hall
 Lea Hall
 Leche House
 Legh Hall
 Legh Old Hall
 Limefield
 Little Moreton Hall
 Lower Carden Hall
 Lower Huxley Hall
 Lower Kinnerton Hall
 Lyme Park
 Lymm Hall
 Manley Knoll
 Manor House, Hale
 Marbury Hall, Anderton with Marbury
 Mere New Hall
 Mere Old Hall
 Middlewich Manor
 Mill House, Adlington
 Mobberley Old Hall
 Moore Hall
 Newton Hall, Mobberley
 Model Cottage, Sandiway
 Moss Hall, Audlem
 Mottram Hall
 Norcliffe Hall
 Norley Hall
 Normans Hall
 North Rode Manor
 Norton Priory
 Oakfield Manor
 Oakmere Hall
 Ollerton Hall
 Orford Hall
 Oughtrington Hall
 Oulton Hall
 Over Tabley Hall
 Overton Hall
 Peckforton Castle
 Peel Hall
 Peover Hall
 Poole Hall
 Pownall Hall
 Puddington Hall
 Puddington Old Hall
 Radbroke Hall
 Ramsdell Hall
 Ravenscroft Hall
 Reaseheath Old Hall
 Rocksavage
 Rode Hall
 Rowton Hall
 Ruloe House
 Runcorn Town Hall
 Saltersley Hall
 The Homestead, Sandiway
 Shavington Hall
 Shotwick Hall
 Shotwick House
 Shrigley Hall
 Somerford Booths Hall
 Somerford Park, Cheshire
 Soss Moss Hall
 Stanley Palace
 Stanthorne Hall
 Stapeley House
 Stretton Hall
 Stretton Lower Hall
 Stretton Old Hall
 Sutton Hall, Little Sutton
 Sutton Hall, Sutton Lane Ends
 Sutton Hall, Sutton Weaver
 Swettenham Hall
 Swineyard Hall
 Tabley House
 Portal, Tarporley
 Tattenhall Hall
 The Rookery, Tattenhall
 Tatton Hall
 Tatton Old Hall
 Tatton Park
 Tilstone Lodge
 Tirley Garth
 Toft Hall
 Trafford Hall
 Tushingham Hall
 Twemlow Hall
 Tytherington Old Hall
 Utkinton Hall
 Walmoor Hill
 Walton Hall
 Warford Hall
 Weaver Hall, Darnhall
 Whatcroft Hall
 Whirley Hall
 Willington Hall
 Winnington Hall
 Willot Hall

Cornwall

 Antony House
 Boconnoc House
 Bonython Manor
 Boswednack Manor
 Caerhays Castle
 Carclew House
 Carnanton House
 Cotehele
 Duporth House
 Erisey
 Fir Hill Manor
 Glynn House
 Godolphin Estate
 Heligan estate
 Ince Castle
 Killigarth Manor
 Lanhydrock House
 Lanteglos Country House Hotel (formerly Lanteglos by Camelford rectory)
 Lawrence House
 Manor of Alverton
 Mount Edgcumbe House
 Pencarrow
 Pengersick Castle
 Penhallam
 Penpol, Lesnewth
 Penrose
 Pentillie Castle
 Peregrine Hall
 Place House
 Polraen Country House Hotel
 Port Eliot
 Prideaux Place
 Prospidnick Manor
 Rose-in-Vale Country House Hotel
 St Michael's Mount
 Tolverne
 Treen Manor
 Tregarden
 Tregenna Castle
 Tregothnan
 Treguddick Manor
 Trelissick House
 Trelowth Manor
 Trenhayle Manor
 Trereife House
 Trerice
 Tresillian House
 Tretheague Manor
 Trewarthenick Estate
 Trewithen House
 Tullimaar House
 Whiteford House
 Withielgoose House

Cumbria

 Abbey House, Barrow-in-Furness
 The Abbey, Skirwith
 Appleby Castle
 Armathwaite Hall
 Ashton House
 Askham Hall
 Aynsome Manor
 Barrow House
 Bassenfell Manor
 Blackwell
 Brantwood
 Brayton Hall
 Brougham Hall
 Cardew House
 Cardew Lodge
 Castle Head
 Cliburn Hall
 Clifton Hall
 Cockermouth Castle
 Conishead Priory
 Coniston Hall
 Corby Castle
 Cowmire Hall
 Dalemain
 Dallam Tower
 Dalton Hall
 Dalston Hall
 Dovenby Hall
 Eccle Riggs
 Eden Hall (demolished)
 Fawe Park
 Flass
 Graythwaite Hall
 Greystoke Castle
 Grizedale Hall (demolished)
 Hampsfield House
 Helsfell Hall
 High Head Castle
 Hill Top
 Holker Hall
 Hollin Hall
 Holmrook Hall
 Hutton in the Forest
 Hutton John
 Ingmire Hall
 Isel Hall
 Langdale Chase
 Langrigg Hall
 Levens Hall
 Lingholm
 Lowbridge House
 Lowther Castle
 Mirehouse
 Moresby Hall
 Mumps Hall
 Muncaster Castle
 Naworth Castle
 Overwater Hall
 Rampside Hall
 Rose Castle
 Rothay Manor
 Rusland Hall
 Rydal Hall
 Salkeld Hall
 Scaleby Castle
 Sedgwick House
 Sizergh Castle and Garden
 Swarthmoor Hall
 Townend
 Tullie House Museum and Art Gallery
 Underley Hall
 Underscar Manor
 Wharton Hall
 Witherslack Hall
 Wray Castle

Derbyshire

 Alfreton Hall
 Alsop Hall
 Ashbourne Hall
 Ashford in the Water Hall
 Aston Hall, Aston-on-Trent
 Bank Hall, Chapel-en-le-Frith
 Barlborough Hall
 Barlow Woodseats Hall
 Bolsover Castle
 Bradbourne Hall
 Bradley Hall
 Breadsall Priory
 Bretby Hall
 Brocksford Hall
 Burton Closes
 Buxton Hall
 Calke Abbey
 Carnfield Hall
 Catton Hall
 Chatsworth House
 Coxbench Hall
 Derwent House, Matlock
 Dethick Manor
 Ednaston Manor
 Elvaston Castle
 Errwood Hall
 Eyam Hall
 Fenny Bentley Old Hall
 Flagg Hall
 Foremarke Hall
 Great Longstone Hall
 Haddon Hall
 Hardwick Hall
 Hartington Hall
 Hassop Hall
 Hayes Conference Centre
 Holme Hall, Bakewell
 Hopton Hall
 Ingleby Toft
 Kedleston Hall
 Locko Park
 Longford Hall
 Melbourne Hall
 Mercaston Hall
 Meynell Hall
 Middleton Hall, Stoney Middleton
 Morley Manor
 Ogston Hall
 Parwich Hall
 Radbourne Hall
 Renishaw Hall
 Riber Castle
 Risley Hall
 Shipley Hall
 Snitterton Hall
 Somersal Herbert Hall
 Somersall Hall
 Stancliffe Hall
 Stanton Hall, Stanton in Peak
 Stubbing Court
 Stydd Hall
 Sudbury Hall
 Sutton Scarsdale Hall
 Tapton House
 Thornbridge Hall
 Tissington Hall
 Walton Hall, Chesterfield
 Walton Hall, Walton-on-Trent
 Whitwell Old Hall
 Wirksworth Hall (demolished)
 Willersley Castle
 Wingfield Manor
 Ye Olde Cinder House

Devon

 Affeton Castle
 A La Ronde
 Arlington Court
 Bark House
 Berry Pomeroy Castle
 Bickleigh Castle
 Bicton House
 Blackhall Manor
 Bowden House
 Bradfield Hall
 Bradley
 Brunel Manor
 Buckland Abbey
 Buckland House
 Butterford House
 Cadhay
 Castle Drogo
 Castle Hill
 Chambercombe Manor
 Coleton Fishacre
 Compton Castle
 Coryton Park
 Court Green
 Creedy, Sandford
 Dartington Hall
 Dartmoor longhouse
 Downes
 The Elizabethan House
 Escot House
 Fallapit House
 Flete House
 Fowlescombe Hall and Manor
 Great Bidlake
 Great Fulford
 Greenway Estate
 Hemerdon House
 Hillersdon House
 Huntsham Court
 Kelly House
 Kennaway House
 Killerton
 Kirkham House
 Kitley House
 Knightshayes Court
 Langdon Court
 Loughwood Meeting House
 Lupton House
 Luscombe Castle
 Lynwood House
 Maristow House
 Moreton House
 Nutwell
 Oldway Mansion
 Orleigh Court
 Overbeck's
 Peamore House
 Poltimore House
 Portledge Manor
 Powderham Castle
 The Prysten House, Plymouth
 Pynes House
 Saltram House
 Sand
 Sandridge Park
 Shiphay Manor
 Shute Barton
 New Shute House
 Sidbury Manor
 Stowford House
 Sydenham House, Devon
 Tapeley Park
 The Three Crowns Hotel
 Tiverton Castle
 Tor Royal
 Torre Abbey
 Totnes Guildhall
 Ugbrooke
 West Challacombe Manor
 Whiteway House
 Wiscombe Park
 Woodway House

Dorset

 Athelhampton
 Brownsea Castle
 Came House
 Charborough House
 Clouds Hill
 Cranborne Manor
 Crichel House
 Eastbury Park
 Edmondsham House
 Fiddleford Manor
 Forde Abbey
 Gloucester House
 Highcliffe Castle
 Kingston Lacy
 Kingston Maurward House
 Kingston Russell
 Langtry Manor
 Leeson House
 Lulworth Castle
 Mappowder Court
 Max Gate
 Merly House
 Melbury House
 Milton Abbey School
 Parnham House
 Pennsylvania Castle
 Purse Caundle Manor
 Sherborne Castle
 Sherborne House
 Smedmore House
 St Giles House, Wimborne St Giles
 Stalbridge
 Stepleton House
 Thomas Hardy's Cottage
 Wolfeton House
 Woolbridge Manor House

County Durham

 Auckland Castle
 Beamish Hall
 Blackwell Grange Hotel
 Brancepeth Castle
 Croxdale Hall
 Dryderdale Hall
 Durham Castle
 Eggleston Hall
 Elemore Hall
 Hamsterley Hall
 Headlam Hall
 Helmington Hall
 Horsley Hall
 Lambton Castle
 Lartington Hall
 Low Dinsdale Manor
 Lumley Castle
 Piercebridge Hall
 Preston Hall, Preston-on-Tees
 Raby Castle
 Ravensworth Castle (ruined)
 Redworth Hall
 Rokeby Park
 Shotton Hall
 Sockburn Hall
 Streatlam Castle
 The Castle, Castle Eden
 The Old Hall, Hurworth-on-Tees
 Walworth Castle
 Witton Castle
 Whitworth Hall
 Windlestone Hall
 Wynyard Park

East Riding of Yorkshire

 Anlaby House
 Boynton Hall
 Brantingham Thorpe
 Burton Agnes Hall
 Burton Agnes Manor House
 Burton Constable Hall
 Cowick Hall
 Dalton Hall (Beverley)
 Garrowby Hall
 Holme Hall, East Riding of Yorkshire
 Houghton Hall, East Riding of Yorkshire
 Londesborough Hall
 Saltmarshe Hall
 Sewerby Hall
 Sledmere House
 Tranby Croft
 Rise Hall
 Wassand Hall

East Sussex

 Anne of Cleves House
 Ashburnham Place
 Ashcombe House
 Bateman's
 Beauport Park
 Beeches Farm
 Bentley House
 Brickwall House
 Brightling Park
 Buckwell Place
 Charleston Farmhouse
 Compton Place
 Durhamford Manor
 Fife House
 Firle Place
 Folkington Manor
 Glynde Place
 Glyndebourne
 Great Dixter
 Hammerwood Park
 Haremere Hall
 Hartfield
 Herstmonceux Castle
 Horsted Place
 Iridge Place
 Lamb House
 Luxford House
 Malling House
 Monk's House
 Moulsecoomb Place
 Normanhurst Court
 Patcham Place
 Plumpton Place
 Preston Manor, Brighton
 Rose Hill
 Sheffield Park Garden
 Stanmer House
 Wargrave House
 Wings Place
 Wootton Manor

Essex

 Abbotswick
 Audley End House
 Barrington Hall, Essex
 Bassingbourne Hall
 Beeleigh Abbey
 Belchamp Hall
 Belhus, Essex
 Belmont Castle
 Berden Hall
 Blake Hall
 Borley Rectory
 Bower Hall (demolished)
 Braxted Park
 Chigwell Hall
 Coopersale House
 Copped Hall
 Creeksea Place Manor
 Danbury Place
 Debden Hall, Uttlesford (demolished)
 Dial House
 Down Hall
 Dutch Cottage
 Fillol's Hall
 Gosfield Hall
 Hadleigh Castle (ruined)
 Hill Hall
 Horham Hall
 Hylands Park
 Ingatestone Hall
 Layer Marney Tower
 Leaden Hall
 Leez Priory
 Marks Hall (demolished)
 Michaelstowe Hall
 Moyns Park
 Orford House
 Orsett Hall
 Oxley House
 Paycocke's
 Shalom Hall
 Spains Hall
 Sturgeons House
 Terling Place

Gloucestershire

 Abbey House, Cirencester
 Ablington Manor
 Acton Court
 Alderley House
 Badminton House
 Barrington Park
 Barnsley Park
 Berkeley Castle
 Bibury Court
 Boxwell Court
 Brockworth Court
 Calcot Manor
 Chavenage House
 Cirencester House
 Clearwell Castle
 Daneway House
 Daylesford House
 Dodington Park
 Dyrham Park
 Edgeworth Manor
 Ellenborough Park
 Elmore Court
 Frampton Court
 Fretherne Court
 Gatcombe Park
 Hardwicke Court
 Hasfield Court
 Highgrove House
 Highnam Court
 Horton Court
 Icomb Place
 Kiftsgate Court Gardens
 Kingscote Park
 Lasborough Park
 Lodge Park and Sherborne Estate
 Lydney Park
 Lypiatt Park
 Manor Farmhouse, Temple Guiting
 The Mythe
 Nether Lypiatt Manor
 Newark Park
 Owlpen Manor
 Quarwood
 Rodmarton Manor
 Sezincote House
 Sheppey Corner
 Sherborne House
 Snowshill Manor
 Speech House
 Stanway House
 St Briavels Castle
 Stonehouse Court Hotel
 Stouts Hill
 Stowell Park
 Stratford Park
 Sudeley Castle
 Swangrove
 Swinhay House
 Thornbury Castle
 Toddington Manor
 Tormarton Court
 Tortworth Court
 Trull House
 Wallsworth Hall
 Westonbirt House
 Wick Court, Arlingham
 Wick Court, Wick
 Whittington Court
 Woodchester Mansion
 Wormington Grange

Greater London

 Addington Palace
 The Albany
 Apsley House
 Arnos Grove House
 Arundel House
 Ashburnham House
 Aubrey House
 Avery Hill
 Ballards, Coombe
 Bath House, Piccadilly
 Beaufort House
 Bedford House, Bloomsbury
 Bedford House, Covent Garden
 Boston Manor House
 Breadalbane House
 Bridgewater House, Westminster
 Brockwell Hall
 Bromley Hall
 Brook House, Mayfair
 Broomfield House (derelict)
 Bruce Castle
 Buckingham House, Pall Mall
 Buckingham Palace
 Burgh House
 Burlington House
 Bushy House
 Cambridge House
 Camelford House
 Camden Place
 Canons Park
 Carlton House
 Carlyle's House
 Carshalton House
 Chandos House
 Chapel House, Twickenham
 Charlton House
 The Charterhouse
 Chatham House
 Chessington Hall
 Chesterfield House
 Chiswick House
 Clarence House
 Clarendon House
 Copped Hall (demolished, was in Hertfordshire)
 Crewe House
 Crofton Roman Villa
 Crosby Place
 Croydon Palace
 Cumberland House
 Danson House
 Debenham House
 Devonshire House
 Devonshire House, Battersea
 Dollis Hill House (demolished)
 Dorchester House
 Down House
 Dover House
 Dudley House
 Eagle House
 Eastbury Manor House
 Eltham Palace
 Ely Place
 Edgwarebury Hotel
 Essex House
 Fenton House
 Forty Hall
 Fulham Palace
 Garden Corner
 Grim's Dyke
 Grosvenor House
 Grovelands Park
 Gunnersbury Park
 Hall Place
 Ham House
 Hampton Court
 Harcourt House
 Hare Hall
 Hertford House
 Highgrove House, Eastcote
 Hillingdon House
 Hogarth's House
 Holland House
 Home House
 Ickenham Hall
 Keats' House
 Kelmscott House
 Kensington Palace
 Kenwood House
 Kew Palace
 Kneller Hall
 Lambeth Palace
 Lancaster House
 Lansdowne House
 Lauderdale House
 Leighton House
 Lichfield House
 Lindsey House
 Little Holland House
 Lowther Lodge
 Marble Hill House
 Marlborough House
 Monkhams (demolished, was in Essex)
 Montagu House, Bloomsbury
 Montagu House, Whitehall
 Newcastle House
 Old Rectory, Wimbledon
 Orleans House
 Ormonde House
 Osterley Park
 Pembroke House, Richmond
 Pembroke House, Whitehall
 Pitzhanger Manor
 Pope's villa
 Powis House
 Queen's House
 Queensberry House
 Ranger's House
 Red House, several places
 Ruskin House
 Rutland House
 Savoy Palace
 Schomberg House
 Shene Manor (demolished, was in Surrey)
 Sir Thomas Gresham's House
 Sloane Place
 Southside House
 Spencer House
 Stotfold
 Strawberry Hill
 Streatham Park
 Sutton House
 Swakeleys House
 Syon Park
 Thatched House Lodge
 Trent Park
 Valence House
 Vanbrugh Castle
 Wanstead House
 Wesley's House
 White Lodge
 The Wick
 Wickham Court
 Wimbourne House
 Winchester Palace
 Winfield House
 Witanhurst
 Woodlands House
 York House, St. James's Palace
 York House, Strand
 York House, Twickenham

Greater Manchester

 84 Plymouth Grove
 Abney Hall
 Agecroft Hall (moved to USA)
 Alkrington Hall
 Ancoats Hall (demolished)
 Atherton Hall, Leigh (demolished)
 Baguley Hall
 Bamford Hall (demolished)
 Barlow Hall
 Belfield Hall (demolished)
 Birchley Hall
 Bramall Hall
 Clayton Hall
 Clegg Hall
 Dunham Massey Hall
 Flixton House
 Foxdenton Hall
 Haigh Hall
 Hall-i'-th'-Wood
 Heaton Hall
 Hopwood Hall
 Hulton Park (demolished)
 Lostock Hall (demolished)
 Manley Hall (demolished)
 Mellor Hall
 Morleys Hall
 Mottram Old Hall
 Ordsall Hall
 Slade Hall
 Smithills Hall
 Staircase House
 Stayley Hall
 Tonge Hall
 Underbank Hall
 Walshaw Hall
 Wardley Hall
 Westhoughton Hall (demolished)
 Winstanley Hall
 Woodbank, Stockport
 Woodfold Hall
 Worsley New Hall (demolished)
 Worsley Old Hall
 Wythenshawe Hall

Hampshire

 Abbess Grange
 Amport House
 Avington Park
 Barclay House
 Basing House
 Basing Park
 Beaulieu Palace House
 Bentworth Hall
 Bisterne Manor
 Bourne House, East Woodhay
 Bramshill House
 Breamore House
 Broadlands
 Burkham House
 Cams Hall
 Chawton House
 Cranbury Park
 Dogmersfield Park
 The Elms (Bedhampton)
 Elvetham Hall
 Eversley Manor
 Exbury House
 Hackwood Park
 Hall Place (Bentworth)
 Headley Grange
 Heckfield Place
 Highclere Castle
 Highfield House, Heckfield
 Hill Place
 Hinton Admiral
 Hinton Ampner
 Houghton Lodge
 Hursley House
 Jane Austen's House Museum
 King's House, Winchester
 Lainston House
 Marshcourt
 Melchet Court
 Minley Manor
 Mottisfont Abbey
 Northington Grange
 Oakley Hall
 Old Alresford House
 Ovington House
 Pax Hill
 Redenham Park
 Rhinefield House
 Roke Manor
 Rotherfield Park
 Silchester House
 Somerley
 South Stoneham House
 Southwick House
 Stargroves
 Stratfield Saye House
 Stratton Park
 Sydmonton Court
 Thedden Grange
 Titchfield Abbey
 The Vyne
 Tylney Hall
 The Wakes
 West Green House
 West Park (demolished)
 Wivelrod Manor
 Wymering Manor

Herefordshire

 Abbey Dore Court
 Allt Yr Ynys Country Hotel
 Bishopswood House
 Belmont House
 Berrington Hall
 Brampton Bryan Hall
 Brinsop Court
 Brockhampton Estate
 Burghill Manor
 Burton Court
 Castle Frome
 Croft Castle
 Cwm
 Dinmore Manor
 Dippersmoor Manor
 Docklow Manor
 Downton Castle
 Eastnor Castle
 Eardisley Park
 Eye Manor
 Ganarew Manor House
 Gatley Park
 Great Marcle Manor
 Hampton Court
 Harewood Park
 Hellens
 Hill Court Manor
 Homme House
 Kentchurch Court
 Kingston Manor
 Kinnersley Castle
 Kyre Park
 Leinthall Manor
 Lemore Manor
 Little Hereford Manor
 Llanrothal Court
 Lower Brockhampton House
 Lude Manor
 Marden Manor
 Moccas Court
 Pengethley Manor Hotel
 Penrhos Court
 Shobdon Court
 Stoke Edith House (ruined)
 Sufton Court
 The Mynde
 Upleden Manor
 Whitbourne Hall
 Wilts Knill Court
 Wyastone Leys

Hertfordshire

 Albury Hall (demolished)
 Ashwell Bury
 Aston Bury
 Balls Park
 Bayfordbury
 Beckingham Palace
 Beechwood Park
 Berkhamsted Place
 Brocket Hall
 Buntingford Manor House
 Bushey Hall
 Cassiobury House (demolished)
 Cell Park (Markyate Cell)
 Cheshunt Great House
 Childwickbury Manor
 Dyrham Park Country Club
 Egerton House, Berkhamsted
 Fanhams Hall
 The Frythe
 Gaddesden Place
 Gadebridge House
 Golden Parsonage
 Old Gorhambury House
 The Grove, Watford
 Hanbury Manor
 Hanstead House
 Hatfield House
 High Elms Manor
 Hilfield Castle
 Hinxworth Place
 Holywell House (demolished)
 Hunsdon House
 Hunton Park
 Knebworth House
 Langleybury
 Lululaund
 Moor Park
Moor Place
 Much Hadham Hall
 Much Hadham Palace
 Newsells Park
 Panshanger
 Pendley Manor
 Putteridge Bury
 Red House, Buntingford
 Rossway
 Rothamsted Manor
 Rye House
 Shaw's Corner
 Shendish Manor
 Shenley Hall
 Sopwell House
 Stocks House
 Theobalds House
 Tolmers Park
 Tring Park Mansion
 Tyttenhanger House
 Verulam House, St Albans
 Wall Hall
 Westbrook Hay
 Westbury Nernewtes Manor
 Woodhall Park
 Wormleybury
 Wrotham Park

Isle of Wight

 Adgestone Manor
 Alverstone Manor
 Appleford Manor
 Appley House
 Appley Towers
 Appuldurcombe House
 Apse Manor
 Arreton Manor
 Ashey Manor
 Bagwich Manor
 Barnsley Manor
 Barton Manor, Whippingham
 Bathingbourne Manor
 Beauchamp Manor
 Bigbury Manor
 Billingham Manor
 Blackpan Manor
 Bleakdown Manor
 Bonchurch Manor
 Borthwood Manor
 Branston Manor
 Bridge Manor
 Briddlesford Manor
 Caines Court
 Chillingwood Manor
 Clavells Manor
 Cleaveland Manor
 Combley Manor
 Court Manor
 Dimbola Lodge
 Durton Manor
 East Cowes Castle
 East Shamlord Manor
 Edington Manor
 Fairlee Manor
 Farringford House
 Gatcombe House
 Great Budbridge Manor
 Great East Standen Manor
 Grove Manor
 Hale Manor
 Hardingshute Manor
 Hardley Manor
 Haseley Manor
 Haven Street Manor
 Hill Manor
 Holloway Manor
 Horringford Manor
 Huffingford Manor
 Kennerly Manor
 Kern Manor
 Knighton Gorges Manor
 Landguard Manor
 Langbridge Manor
 Landguard Manor
 Lee Manor
 Lessland Manor
 Lisle Combe
 Luccombe Manor
 Merstone Manor
 Milton Manor
 Mirables
 Morton Manor
 Munsley Manor
 Nettlestone Manor
 Norris Castle
 Nunwell Manor
 Osborne House
 Pan Manor
 Park Manor
 Perreton Manor
 Pidford Manor
 Preston Manor
 Princelet Manor
 Puckpool Manor
 Quarr Abbey House
 Redway Manor
 Rew Manor
 Rookley Manor
 Roud Manor
 Rowborough Manor
 Ryde Manor
 Rylstone Manor
 Sandford Manor
 Sandown Manor
 Scotlesford Manor
 Shanklin Manor
 Sheat Manor
 Shide Manor
 Smallbrook Manor
 Span Manor
 St. Clare Castle
 St. Lawrence Manor
 Standen House
 Staplehurst Manor
 Steephill Manor
 Stenbury Manor
 Swainston Manor
 Thorley Manor
 Wackland Manor
 Week Manor
 Westbrook Manor
 Westcourt Manor
 West Shamlord Manor
 Whitefield Manor
 Winston Manor
 Wode Manor
 Wolverton Manor
 Woodhouse Manor
 Woodlands Vale
 Woolverton Manor
 Wooton Manor
 Wroxall Manor
 Yaverland Manor

Kent

 Agnes Court
 Allington Castle
 Archbishop's Palace, Maidstone
 Barham Court
 Beachborough Manor
 Belmont House and Gardens
 Betteshanger House
 Bleak House, Broadstairs
 Boughton Place
 Boughton Monchelsea Place
 Bradbourne House
 Broome Park
 Chartwell
 Chevening
 Chiddingstone Castle
 Chilham Castle
 Cobham Hall
 Doddington Place
 Dorton House
 Eastwell Park
 Eyhorne Manor
 Finchcocks
 Franks Hall
 Gads Hill Place
 Godinton House
 The Grange, Ramsgate
 Great Maytham Hall
 Goodnestone Park
 Hadlow Castle
 Hever Castle
 Higham Park
 Holcombe Manor
 Hole Park
 Hollingbourne Manor
 Howletts
 Ingress Abbey
 The Hospital of St Thomas, Canterbury
 Ightham Mote
 Kingsgate Castle
 Knole House
 Knowlton Court
 Lee Priory (demolished)
 Leeds Castle
 Linton Park
 Long Barn
 Lullingstone Castle
 Lympne Castle
 Mereworth Castle
 Mersham le Hatch
 Mote Park
 Olantigh
 Old Soar Manor
 Owletts
 Owl House
 Oxon Hoath
 Pattyndenne Manor
 Penshurst Place
 Port Lympne Mansion
 Preston Hall, Aylesford
 Quebec House
 Quex Park
 Restoration House
 Riverhill House
 Roydon Hall
 The Salutation
 Scotney Castle
 Scot's Hall (demolished)
 Sharsted Court
 Sheriffs Court, Minster
 Somerhill House
 Spade House
 Squerryes Court
 St Clere, Kent
 Surrenden House (demolished)
 Temple Manor
 Tudor House
 Waldershare Park
 Walmer Castle

Lancashire

 Abbeystead House
 Adlington Hall (demolished)
 Aldcliffe Hall (demolished)
 Alkincoats Hall (demolished)
 Alston Hall
 Ashton Hall
 Astley Hall
 Bank Hall
 Bardsea Hall (demolished)
 Billinge Scar (demolished)
 Blythe Hall, Lathom
 Borwick Hall
 Browsholme Hall
 Bryn Hall
 Buckshaw Hall
 Burrow Hall
 Capernwray Hall
 Carr House
 Chingle Hall
 Croston Hall (demolished)
 Cuerden Hall
 Downham Hall
 Dunnow Hall
 Duxbury Hall (demolished)
 Eaves Hall
 Emmott Hall (demolished)
 Escowbeck
 Extwistle Hall (derelict)
 Gawthorpe Hall
 Gillibrand Hall
 Gisburne Park
 Greaves Hall (demolished)
 Hammerton Hall
 Hazelwood Hall
 Heskin Hall
 Hoghton Tower
 Hollinshead Hall (ruined)
 Holme Hall (ruined)
 Hornby Castle
 Huntroyde Hall
 Lathom House (demolished)
 Leck Hall
 Leighton Hall
 Littledale Hall
 Lytham Hall
 Martholme
 Mawdesley Hall
 Mitton Hall
 Moor Hall, Aughton
 New Hall, Edenfield
 Old Hall, Great Mitton
 Quernmore Park
 Read Hall and Park
 Rivington Hall
 Rossall Hall
 Rufford New Hall
 Rufford Old Hall
 Runshaw Hall
 Samlesbury Hall
 Scarisbrick Hall
 Shaw Hall, Leyland
 Shaw Hill
 Shuttleworth Hall
 The Old Zoo
 Thurland Castle
 Thurnham Hall
 Towneley Hall
 Tulketh Hall (demolished)
 Turton Tower
 Waddington Old Hall
 Waddow Hall
 Wennington Hall
 Whittington Hall
 Winmarleigh Hall
 Woodfold Hall
 Wrightington Hall
 Wycoller Hall (ruined)
 Wyresdale Hall

Leicestershire

 Ab Kettleby Manor
 Appleby Manor
 Asfordby Hall
 Ashby de la Zouch Castle
 Ashby Folville Manor
 Ashmede Hall
 Aston Flamville Manor
 Baggrave Hall
 Bardon Hall
 Barkby Hall
 Beaumanor Hall
 Beeby Manor
 Belgrave Hall
 Belvoir Castle
 Billesdon Coplow
 Bosworth Hall (Husbands Bosworth)
 Bosworth Hall (Market Bosworth)
 Bradgate House 1520
 Bradgate House 1856
 Brentingby Hall
 Brooksby Hall
 Buckminster Hall
 Burleigh Hall
 Burrough on the Hill Manor
 Burton Hall
 Cadeby Manor
 Carlton Curlieu Hall
 Castle Rock House
 Cold Overton Hall
 Coleorton Hall
 Cosby Hall
 Cotesbach Manor
 Coton Priory
 Dalby Old Hall
 Desford Old Hall
 Dishley Grange
 Donington Hall
 Donington le Heath Manor House Museum
 Eastwell Hall
 Edmondthorpe Hall
 Enderby House
 Frolesworth House
 Gaddesby Hall
 Galby Manor
 Garendon Hall
 Goadby Hall
 Gopsall Hall
 Grace Dieu Manor
 Great Glen Hall
 Groby Old Hall
 Gumley Hall
 Hallaton Manor
 Hemington Hall
 Ingarsby Old Hall
 Keythorpe Hall
 Kibworth Hall
 King's Norton Manor
 Kirby Park
 Kirby Muxloe Castle
 Langton Hall
 Launde Abbey
 Leire House
 Little Stretton Manor
 Lockington Hall
 Loddington Hall
 Long Clawson Old Manor
 Lowesby Hall
 Measham Hall
 Medbourne Manor
 Medbourne Old Hall
 Morebarne Grange
 Narborough Hall
 Nether Hall
 Nevill Holt Hall
 Newbold Verdon Hall
 New House Grange
 Newton Harcourt Manor
 Noseley Hall
 Orton Hall
 Osbaston Hall
 Othorpe House
 Papillon Hall, Lubenham
 Peatling Parva Hall
 Potters Marston Hall
 Prestwold Hall
 Quenby Hall
 Quorn Hall
 Ragdale Old Hall (demolished)
 Ragdale New Hall
 Ratcliffe Hall
 Ravenstone Hall
 Rothley Temple
 Saxelby Manor
 Scalford Hall
 Scraptoft Hall
 Sheepy Hall
 Shenton Hall
 Shoby Priory
 Skeffington Hall
 Stanford Hall
 Stapleford Park
 Stoughton Grange
 Staunton Harold Hall
 Stockerston Hall
 Stonton Wyville Manor
 Stretton Hall
 Sutton Cheney Manor
 Swithland Hall
 Tur Langton Manor
 Whatton Hall
 Wigston Parva Hall
 Willesley Hall (demolished)
 Willoughby Waterleys Old Hall
 Wistow Hall
 Withcote Hall
 Wykin Hall
 Wymondham Manor

Lincolnshire

 Alford Manor House
 Ashby Hall
 Aubourn Hall
 Ayscoughfee Hall
 Baysgarth House Museum
 Belton House
 Bloxholm Hall (partially demolished)
 Branston Hall
 Brocklesby Hall
 Canwick Hall
 Church Farm Museum
 Cockerington Hall (demolished)
 Coleby Hall
 Cranmer Hall
 Cressy Hall
 Culverthorpe Hall
 Denton Hall (demolished)
 Doddington Hall
 Down Hall, Barrow upon Humber
 Elsham Hall
 Ferndale Manor
 Gainsborough Old Hall
 Glentworth Hall
 Grimsthorpe Castle
 Gunby Hall
 Harlaxton Manor
 Harrington Hall
 Hungerton Hall
 Jew's House
 Kettlethorpe Hall
 Leadenham House
 Manor of Scrivelsby (demolished)
 Marston Hall
 Nocton Hall
 Normanby Hall
 Revesby Abbey
 Riby Grove (demolished)
 Somersby Grange
 Stainfield Hall
 Syston Park (demolished)
 Tattershall Castle
 Thetford
 Wellingore Hall
 Willingham House
 Woolsthorpe Manor

Merseyside

 Allerton Grove
 Allerton Hall
 Birchley Hall
 Broughton Hall
 Calderstones Mansion House
 Carnatic Hall
 Croxteth Hall
 Dawpool (demolished)
 Eccleston Hall
 Formby Hall
 Gayton Hall
 Ince Blundell Hall
 Irby Hall
 Knowsley Hall
 Liscard Hall (demolished)
 Meols Hall
 Poulton Hall
 Speke Hall
 Storeton Hall
 Thingwall Hall
 Thingwall House
 Thornton Manor
 Thurstaston Hall
 Woolton Hall

Norfolk

 Anmer Hall
 Barningham Hall
 Baconsthorpe Castle
 Beaupré Hall
 Belcoombe Manor
 Blakeney Guildhall
 Blickling Hall
 Breccles Hall
 Bylaugh Hall
 Castle Rising
 Costessey Hall (demolished)
 Cranmer Hall, Norfolk
 Crimplesham Hall
 Cromer Hall
 Ditchingham Hall
 Earsham Hall
 East Barsham Manor
 Ellingham Hall
 Farfield
 Felbrigg Hall
 Gillingham Hall
 Gissing Hall
 Gresham Castle
 Hales Hall
 Halvergate Hall
 Hanworth Hall
 Heydon Hall
 Holkham Hall
 Home Place, Kelling
 Honingham Hall (demolished)
 Horstead Hall
 Houghton Hall
 How Hill House
 Hoxun Court
 Huntingfield Manor
 Kelling Hall
 Langley Hall
 Lesingham House
 Letton Hall
 Lynford Hall
 Mannington Hall
 Manor Farm, Diss
 Melton Constable Hall
 Merton Hall
 Middleton Towers
 Morley Old Hall
 Narborough Hall
 Narford Hall
 Overstrand Hall
 Oxburgh Hall
 Oxnead Hall
 Raveningham Hall
 Raynham Hall
 Salle Park
 Sandringham House
 Shelton Hall
 Sheringham Hall
 Shropham Hall
 South Acre Hall
 Sprowston Manor
 Tacolneston Hall
 Thornham Manor
 Windham Manor
 Winnold House
 Wolterton Hall
 Wood Farm

Northamptonshire

 Althorp House
 Apethorpe Hall
 Arthingworth Manor
 Astrop House
 Astwell Castle
 Aynhoe Park
 Barnwell Manor
 Barton Seagrave
 Beeston Hall
 Biggin Hall
 Blakesley Hall
 Blisworth
 Boughton House
 Burton Latimer Hall
 Canons Ashby House
 Castle Ashby Manor
 Caswell
 Cosgrove
 Cottesbrooke Hall
 Courteenhall
 Cransley Hall
 Crostwight Hall
 Croyland Abbey, Wellingborough
 Deene Park
 Drayton House
 East Carlton Hall
 Easton Neston
 Edgcote
 Eydon Hall
 Finedon Hall
 Flore House
 Gayton Manor House
 Glassthorpe Manor (demolished)
 Great Addington Manor
 Great Oakley Hall
 Highgate House
 Holdenby House
 Kelmarsh Hall
 Ken Hill (house)
 King's Sutton
 Kirby Hall
 Lamport Hall
 Laxton Hall
 Lilford Hall
 Lyveden New Bield
 Oakleigh House
 Rockingham Castle
 Rushden Hall
 Rushton Hall
 Rushton Triangular Lodge
 Shadwell Park
 Sheringham Park
 Stanwick Hall
 Stoke Park Pavilions
 Sulgrave
 Thenford House
 Waxham Hall
 Wolterton Park
 Worstead House

Northumberland

 Adderstone Hall
 Alnwick Castle
 Aydon Castle
 Bamburgh Castle
 Barmoor Castle
 Beaufront Castle
 Belford Hall
 Bellister Castle
 Belsay Castle
 Belsay Hall
 Biddlestone Hall
 Blagdon Hall
 Blanchland Abbey
 Blenkinsopp Castle
 Blenkinsop Hall
 Bothal Castle
 Bywell Hall
 Callaly Castle
 Capheaton Hall
 Causey Park House
 Cherryburn
 Chesters (Humshaugh)
 Chillingham Castle
 Chipchase Castle
 Churnsike Lodge
 Clennell Hall
 Close House
 Collingwood House, Morpeth
 Coupland Castle
 Cragside
 Craster Tower
 Dally Castle
 Dilston Castle
 Dissington Hall
 Eglingham Hall
 Ellingham Hall
 Embleton Hall
 Eshott Hall
 Eslington Park
 Featherstone Castle
 Fowberry Tower
 Haughton Castle
 Hethpool House, Kirknewton
 Howick Hall
 Kirkharle Hall
 Kirkley Hall
 Lemmington Hall
 Lilburn Tower
 Linden Hall
 Lindisfarne Castle
 Little Harle Tower
 Marshall Meadows Country House Hotel
 Matfen Hall
 Milbourne Hall
 Mitford Hall
 Mitford Old Manor House
 Netherwitton Hall
 Newbrough Hall
 Nunnykirk Hall
 Ogle Castle
 Otterburn Hall
 Otterburn Tower
 Ponteland Castle
 Seaton Delaval Hall
 Shawdon Hall
 Swarland Old Hall
 Unthank Hall
 Wallington Hall
 Walwick Grange
 Westhall
 Whalton Manor

North Yorkshire

 Acklam Hall
 Aldby Park
 Allerton Castle
 Aske Hall
 Bedale Hall
 Beningbrough Hall
 Birdsall House
 Bishopthorpe Palace
 Bolton Hall
 Broughton Hall
 Byram Hall (demolished)
 Carlton Towers
 Castle Howard
 Cliff House
 Clifton Castle
 Constable Burton Hall
 Crayke Castle
 Crathorne Hall
 Denton Hall, Wharfedale
 Duncombe Park
 Dunsley Hall
 Ebberston Hall
 Eshton Hall
 Farnley Hall
 Forcett Hall
 Fountains Hall
 Friar Garth Farmhouse
 Gilling Castle
 Gisborough Hall
 Grimston Park
 Goldsborough Hall
 Hartforth Hall
 Hauxwell Hall
 Hazlewood Castle
 Heslington Hall
 Hornby Castle
 Hovingham Hall
 Howsham Hall
 Kiplin Hall
 Kirkby Fleetham Hall
 Markenfield Hall
 Marske Hall
 Middlethorpe Hall
 Middlethorpe Manor
 Middleton Lodge
 Monk Fryston Hall
 Moulton Hall
 Mulgrave Castle
 Nappa Hall
 Netherside Hall
 Norton Conyers House
 Newburgh Priory
 Newby Hall
 Newfield Hall
 Nidd Hall
 Nun Appleton Hall
 Nunnington Hall
 Ormesby Hall
 Otterington Hall
 Preston Park
 Raven Hall
 Ribston Hall
 The Ridding
 Ripley Castle
 Rudding Park House
 Rushpool Hall
 Scampston Hall
 Scargill House
 Shandy Hall
 Simonstone Hall
 Sion Hill Hall
 Skelton Castle
 Skelton Hall
 Skipton Castle
 Stockeld Park
 Stockton Hall, York
 Studley Royal House (demolished)
 Sutton Park
 Swinton Park
 Thirkleby Hall (demolished)
 Thornton Watlass Hall
 Wilton Castle
Wrea Head Hall
 Wykeham Abbey

Nottinghamshire

 Annesley Hall
 Bestwood Lodge
 Blyth Hall (demolished)
 Bulwell Hall (demolished)
 Bunny Hall
 Clifton Hall, Nottingham
 Colwick Hall
 Clumber House (demolished)
 Felley Priory
 Flintham Hall
 Hermeston Hall
 Grove Hall
 Thoresby Hall
 Hodsock Priory
 Holme Pierrepont Hall
 Lound Hall
 Langford Hall
 Lenton Hall
 Kelham Hall
 Mapperley Hall
 Mr Straw's House
 Newstead Abbey
 Norwood Park
 Nuthall Temple (demolished)
 Ollerton Hall
 Osberton Hall
 Ossington Hall (demolished)
 Ranby House
 Ruddington Hall
 Rufford Abbey
 Serlby
 Shireoaks Hall
 Stanford Hall
 Staunton Hall
 Teversal Manor
 Thoresby Hall
 Thrumpton Hall
 Thurgarton Priory
 Upton Hall
 Welbeck Abbey
 Winkburn Hall
 Winthorpe Hall
 Wiseton Hall (demolished)
 Wiverton Hall
 Wollaton Hall
 Worksop Manor

Oxfordshire

 The Abbey, Sutton Courtenay
 Ardington House
 Ashdown House
 Ascott Manor
 Asthall Manor
 Balescote Manor
 Beckett Hall
 Blenheim Palace
 Braziers Park
 Britwell Salome House
 Broughton Castle
 Buckland House
 Burford Priory
 Buscot Park
 Carswell Manor
 Cecilia Castle House
 Charney Manor
 Chastleton House
 Clifton Hampden Manor
 Cogges Manor Farm Museum
 Cokethorpe Park
 Coleshill House (demolished, was in Berkshire)
 Compton Beauchamp House
 Cornbury Park
 Crocker End House
 Crowsley Park
 Culham Manor
 Denman College
 Ditchley
 Edgecote House
 Eynsham Hall
 Friar Park
 Fyfield Manor
 Garsington Manor
 Ginge Manor
 Glympton Park
 Greys Court
 Hardwick House
 Haseley Court
 Headington Hill Hall
 Henley Park
 Heythrop Park
 Jack Straw's Farmhouse
 Kelmscott Manor
 Kingston Bagpuize House
 Kingston Lisle Park
 Kirklington Park
 Longworth House
 The Manor Studio
 Mapledurham House
 The Mill House
 Milton Manor
 Minster Lovell Hall
 North Aston Hall
 Nuffield Place
 Nuneham House
 Phyllis Court
 Rousham House
 Rycote House
 Sarsden House
 Shirburn Castle
 Shotover Park
 Stanton Harcourt Manor
 Stonor Park
 Sutton Courtenay Manor
 The Vines, Oxford
 Wilcote
 Woodperry House
 Woodstock Palace
 Wroxton Manor

Rutland

 Ashwell Hall
 Ayston Hall
 Barnsdale
 Belton Old Hall
 Burley on the Hill House
 Clipsham Hall
 Cottesmore Hall
 Edith Weston Hall (demolished)
 Exton Hall
 Hambleton Old Hall
 Luffenham Hall
 Lyddington Bede House
 Lyndon Hall, Rutland
 Lyndon Top Hall
 Manton Old Hall
 Market Overton Hall
 Morcott Manor
 Normanton Hall (demolished)
 Preston Manor
 Ryhall Hall
 Seaton Manor
 South Luffenham Hall
 Stocken Hall
 Tickencote Hall
 Tixover Hall
 Tolethorpe Hall

Shropshire

 Acton Burnell Castle
 Acton Reynald Hall
 Acton Round Hall
 Adcote
 Adderley Hall (demolished)
 Aldenham Park
 Apley Hall
 Aston Hall
 Aston Eyre Hall
 Attingham Park
 Badger Hall (largely demolished)
 Bedstone Court
 Benthall Hall
 Bitterley Court
 Boscobel House
 Brand Hall
 Brogyntyn
 Broncroft Castle
 Buntingsdale Hall
 Burford House
 Castle Lodge, Ludlow
 Chetwynd Hall (demolished)
 Cloverley Hall
 Condover Hall
 Coton Hall
 Cound Hall
 Cronkhill
 Davenport House
 Downton Hall
 Dudmaston Hall
 Ferney Hall
 Halston Hall
 Hampton Hall
 Haughton Hall
 Hawkstone Hall
 Henley Hall
 High Ercall Hall
 Hodnet Hall
 Kinlet Hall
 Leighton Hall
 Lilleshall Hall
 Longford Hall
 Longner Hall
 Longnor Hall
 Loton Park
 Ludford House
 Madeley Court
 Mawley Hall
 Millichope Park
 Minsterley Hall
 Moreton Corbet Castle
 Morville Hall
 Netley Hall
 Oakly Park
 Pell Wall Hall
 Peplow Hall
 Pitchford Hall
 Plowden Hall
 Preston Hall, Preston Brockhurst
 Quatford Castle
 Rowton Castle
 Sansaw
 Shavington Hall, Adderley (demolished)
 Shavington Hall, Shavington cum Gresty
 Shelvock Manor
 Shipton Hall
 Sild Hall
 Soulton Hall
 Stanley Hall
 Stanmore Hall
 Stokesay Castle
 Stokesay Court
 Sunnycroft
 The Mount, Shrewsbury
 Tong Castle
 Upton Cressett Hall
 Walcot Hall
 Whitton Hall
 Wilderhope Manor
 Willey Hall
 Woodcote Hall

Somerset

 The Abbey, Beckington
 The Abbey, Charlton Adam
 The Abbey, Ditcheat
 Abbotsfield, Wiveliscombe
 Alfoxton House
 Ammerdown House, Kilmersdon
 Ashcombe House
 Ashton Court
 Ashwick Court
 Ashwick House (near Dulverton)
 Babington House
 Banwell Castle
 Barford Park
 Barrington Court
 Barton Grange, Corfe
 Barwick Park
 Bathealton Court
 Beckington Castle
 Blackmoor Farmhouse, Cannington
 Bratton Court
 Brympton d'Evercy
 Burton Pynsent House
 Camerton Court
 Cannington Court
 Chapel Cleeve Manor
 Charlton House, Wraxall
 Clapton Court
 Claverton Manor
 Clevedon Court
 Coker Court
 Combe Hay Manor
 Combe Sydenham
 Cothay Manor
 Cothelstone Manor
 Court House, East Quantoxhead
 Cricket St Thomas
 Crowe Hall
 Dillington House
 Dinder House
 Dunster Castle
 Earnshill House
 East Lambrook Manor
 Enmore Castle
 Fairfield House, Bath
 Farleigh House
 Farleigh Hungerford Castle
 Fyne Court
 Gatcombe
 Gaulden Manor
 Gothelney Hall
 Gournay Court
 Greenham Barton
 Gurney Manor
 Hadspen house and garden
 Halsway Manor
 Halswell House
 Hatch Court
 Hestercombe House
 Hinton House
 Horsington House
 Hymerford House
 Kelston Park
 King John's Hunting Lodge, Axbridge
 Kingweston House
 Leigh Court
 Lions House, Bridgwater
 Lytes Cary
 Manor House, West Coker
 Marshal Wade's House
 Marston Bigot
 Maunsel House
 Mells Manor
 Midelney Manor
 Midford Castle
 Montacute House
 Nailsea Court
 Naish Priory
 Nettlecombe Court
 Newton Park
 Newton Surmaville
 North Cadbury Court
 Nynehead Court
 The Old Manor, Croscombe
 Orchardleigh Estate
 Orchard Wyndham
 Over Langford Manor
 Petherton Park
 Pightley Manor
 Pixton Park
 Poundisford Park
 Prior Park
 Quantock Lodge
 Ralph Allen's Town House, Bath
 Robin Hood's Hut
 Sandhill Park
 Saltford Manor House
 Seymours Court Farmhouse, Beckington
 Shanks House
 Shockerwick House
 Simonsbath House
 Southill House, Cranmore
 St Audries Park
 St Catherine's Court
 Stoke sub Hamdon Priory
 Ston Easton Park
 Sutton Court
 Tintinhull Court
 Tone Dale House
 Treasurer's House
 The Tribunal, Glastonbury
 Tudor House, Langport
 Tyntesfield
 Ven House
 Walton Castle
 Wayford Manor House
 Westcombe House
 Whitestaunton Manor
 Widcombe Manor House
 Wigborough Manor House
 Woodspring Priory
 Woolston Manor

South Yorkshire

Aston Hall
 Banner Cross Hall
 Barnes Hall
 Birley Old Hall
 Bishops' House
 Brodsworth Hall
 Broom Hall
 Burntwood Hall
 Burrowlee House
 Cannon Hall
 Cantley Hall
 Carbrook Hall
 Cusworth Hall
 Dial House
 Endcliffe Hall
 Fulwood Hall
 Hallfield House
 Hatfield Manor House
 Hickleton Hall
 Hillsborough House
 Hooton Pagnell Hall
 Houndhill
 Leader House
 Loxley House
 Mount Pleasant
 Mylnhurst
 Norton Hall
 Oakes Park
 Old Bank House
 Onesacre Hall
 Parkhead Hall
 Queen's Tower
 Revell Grange
 Riverdale House
 Roche Abbey
 Sandbeck Hall
 Sheffield Manor
 Sprotbrough House (demolished)
 Stumperlowe Hall
 Sugworth Hall
 Swinden House
 Tapton Hall
 The Mount, Sheffield
 The Towers
 Thornbury
 Wadworth Hall
 Wentworth Castle
 Wentworth Woodhouse
 Whirlow Hall
 Whitley Hall
 Whiteley Wood Hall (demolished)
 Wortley Hall

Staffordshire

 Abbey House, Ranton (ruined)
 Alton Castle
 Alton Towers
 Ancient High House
 Apedale Hall
 Aqualate Hall
 Ashcombe Park
 Barlaston Hall
 Beamhurst Hall
 Beaudesert (house) (demolished)
 Betley Court
 Betley Hall (demolished)
 Biddulph Grange
 Blithfield Hall
 Broughton Hall
 Calwich Abbey (demolished)
 Caverswall Castle
 Chillington Hall
 Croxall Hall
 Drayton Manor
 Dovecliff Hall
 Dunstall Hall
 Dunsley Hall
 Elmhurst Hall
 Enville Hall
 Erasmus Darwin House
 Etruria Hall
 Ford Green Hall
 Forton Hall
 Grendon Hall, Atherstone (demolished)
 Hagley Hall, Rugeley (demolished)
 Hanch Hall
 Haselour Hall
 The Heath House
 Himley Hall
 Hoar Cross Hall
 Ilam Park
 Ingestre Hall
 Knypersley Hall
 Madeley Old Hall
 Maer Hall
 Manley Hall (demolished)
 Milford Hall
 Moseley Old Hall
 Packington Hall
 Patshull Hall
 Rolleston Hall (demolished)
 Sandon Hall
 Shugborough Hall
 Somerford Hall
 Statfold Hall
 Stourton Castle
 Stretton Hall
 Swynnerton Hall
 Teddesley Hall
 The Villas
 The Wodehouse
 Thornbury Hall
 Thorpe Constantine Hall
 Throwley Old Hall (ruined)
 Trentham Gardens
 Turnhurst
 Weston Park
 Westwood Hall
 Whitmore Hall
 Whittington Old Hall
 Wolseley Hall (demolished)
 Wootton Lodge
 Wrottesley Hall
 Wychnor Hall

Suffolk

 Abbas Hall
 Acton Place  (demolished)
 Ampton Hall
 Ancient House, Clare
 Ancient House, Ipswich
 Angel Corner
 Assington Hall  (demolished)
 Barking Hall  (demolished)
 Barton Hall  (demolished)
 Bawdsey Manor
 Benacre Hall
 Benhall Lodge
 Bidenly Hall
 Boulge Hall (demolished)
 Brampton Hall
 Branches Park  (demolished)
 Bredfield House (demolished)
 Bridge Cottage
 Brightwell Hall (demolished)
 Brome Hall  (demolished)
 Manor of Byng
 Campsea Ashe High House  (demolished)
 Carlton Hall  (demolished)
 Cavenham Hall  (demolished)
 Chediston Hall  (demolished)
 Christchurch Mansion
 Cockfield Hall
 Coldham Hall
 Cotton Hall
 Culford Park
 Dalham Hall
 Desning Hall
 Downham Hall  (demolished)
 Drinkstone Park  (demolished)
 Easton Park  (demolished)
 Edwardstone Hall  (demolished)
 Euston Hall
 Finborough Hall
 Flixton Hall  (demolished)
 Fornham Hall  (demolished)
 Gainsborough's House
 Gipping Hall
 Glemham Hall
 Glevering Hall
 Great Glemham House
 Grimston Hall, Suffolk
 Hardwick House (demolished)
 Haughley Park
 Helmingham Hall
 Hengrave Hall
 Henham Park  (demolished)
 Henstead House
 Heveningham Hall
 Hintlesham Hall
 Hobland Hall (demolished)
 Holton Hall  (demolished)
 Hunston Hall  (demolished)
 Hurt's Hall
 Ickworth House
 Kentwell Hall
 Lawshall Hall
 Livermere Hall  (demolished)
 Melford Hall
 Mildenhall Manor  (demolished)
 Morpeth House
 Moulton Paddocks  (demolished)
 Nether Hall
 Newe House
 Oakley Park  (demolished)
 Ousden Hall  (demolished)
 Otley Hall
 Pakenham Hall (demolished)
 Parham Hall
 Plashwood
 The Priory
 Redgrave Hall  (demolished)
 Red House, Ipswich  (demolished)
 Rendlesham Hall  (demolished)
 Rougham Hall  (demolished)
 Rushbrooke Hall  (demolished)
 Shrubland Park
 Sizewell Hall
 Smallbridge Hall
 Somerleyton Hall
 Sotterley Hall
 Stoke Park  (demolished)
 Sudbourne Hall  (demolished)
 Tendring Hall  (demolished)
 Thorington Hall (demolished)
 Thornham Hall  (demolished)
 Ufford Place
 Westhorpe Hall
 Willy Lott's Cottage
 Wingfield Castle
 Wingfield College
 Woolverstone Hall
 Worlingham Hall
 Worlington Hall
 Wrentham Hall

Surrey

 Albury Park
 Bagshot Park
 Banstead Wood
 Benjamin Manor Park
 Botleys Mansion
 Boyle Farm
 Cain Manor
 Cherkley Court
 Clandon House
 Claremont
 Cobham Park
 Deepdene House and Gardens
 Denbies
 Denbies Wine Estate
 Detillens
 Eastley End House
 Fetcham Park House
 Fort Belvedere
 Goddards
 Great Fosters
 Guildford House
 Hascombe Court
 Hatchlands Park
 Heywood House
 Horsley Towers
 Juniper Hall
 Kenwood, St. George's Hill
 Laleham Abbey
 Loseley Park
 Milton Court
 Nonsuch Mansion
 Nonsuch Palace (demolished)
 Oakhurst Cottage
 Oatlands Palace (demolished)
 Peper Harow
 Polesden Lacey
 Portnall Park, Virginia Water
 Ribsden Holt
 Sanderstead Court
 Stanwell Place (demolished, was in Middlesex)
 Sunbury Court
 Sunny Heights
 Sutton Place
 Titsey Place
 Updown Court
 Undershaw
 Windlesham Moor
 Witley Park
 Woking Palace
 Woodcote Park
 Worcester Park House

Tyne and Wear

 Axwell House
 Chirton Hall
 Gibside
 Gosforth House
 Stella Park
 Washington Old Hall

Warwickshire

 Alscot Park
 Anne Hathaway's Cottage
 Arbury Hall
 Baddesley Clinton
 Barrells Hall
 Brownsover Hall
 Charlecote Park
 Compton Verney House
 Compton Wynyates
 Coombe Abbey
 Coughton Court
 Dunsmore House
 Ettington Park
 Farnborough Hall
 Guy's Cliffe
 Haseley Manor
 Honington Hall
 Lord Leycester hospital
 Mary Arden's House
 Maxstoke Castle
 Merevale Hall
 Middleton Hall
 New Place
 Newbold Revel
 Offchurch Bury
 Packwood House
 Ragley Hall
 The Regent Hotel
 Stoneleigh Abbey
 Stoneton Manor
 Upton House
 Walton Hall
 Warwick Castle
 Whateley Hall, Castle Bromwich
 Wolvey Hall
 Wormleighton Manor

West Midlands

 Aston Hall
 Berry Hall Farm
 Birmingham Back to Backs
 Bishop Asbury Cottage
 Blakesley Hall
 Bordesley Hall, Birmingham (demolished)
 Castle Bromwich Hall
 Dorlestone Hall
 Edgbaston Hall
 Ellowes Hall (demolished)
 Fox Hollies Hall
 Great Barr Hall
 Grimshaw Hall
 Haden Hill House
 Highbury Hall
 Little Aston Hall
 Moseley Hall, Birmingham
 New Berry Hall
 New Hall Manor
 Oak House, West Bromwich
 Perry Hall (demolished)
 Priory Hall, Dudley
 Red House Park
 Sandwell Hall (demolished)
 Selly Manor
 Soho House
 Solihull Manor House
 Stratford House
 West Bromwich Manor House
 Wightwick Manor
 Woodloes Farm
 Yateley Road

West Sussex

 The Abbey, Storrington
 Abersley Hall
 Aldworth House
 Arundel Castle
 Beach House
 Bignor Park
 Blackdown House
 Borde Hill Garden
 Brantridge Park
 Burton park
 Castle Goring
 Charlwood House
 Chithurst Abbey
 Coates House
 Cowdray House
 Cowdray Park
 Danny House
 Denne Park House
 East Lavington House
 Ecclesden Manor, Angmering
 Ewhurst Manor
 Field Place 
 Felpham Manor House
 Findon Place
 Goodwood House
 Halnaker House
 Holmbush, near Faygate
 Hotham Park House
 Knepp Castle
 Lavington Park
 Legh Manor
 Leonardslee
 Muntham Court (demolished)
 Newtimber Place
 Ockenden Manor
 Parham Park
 Petworth House
 Pitshill
 Saint Hill Manor
 Sedgewick Park
 Sennicotts
 Shermanbury Place
 Shillinglee
 South Mundham House
 Standen
 Stansted Park
 Stoneley House
 Uppark
 Upper Roundhurst House
 Wakehurst Place
 Weald and Downland Open Air Museum
 West Dean House
 West Lavington House
 Wiston House
 Woolbeding House

West Yorkshire

 Austhorpe Hall
 Bankfield Museum
 Becca Hall
 Bolling Hall, Bradford
 Bowcliffe Hall
 Bracken Hall Countryside Centre and Museum
 Bramham Park
 Bretton Hall
 Brontë Parsonage Museum
 Calverley Old Hall
 Carr Manor
 Chevet Hall (demolished)
 Cliffe Castle Museum
 Creskeld Hall
 Dobroyd Castle
 East Riddlesden Hall
 Esholt Hall
 Farnley Hall
 Fryston Hall (demolished)
 Gledstone Hall
 Harewood House
 Holdsworth House
 Kirklees Hall
 Lotherton Hall
 Manor House Museum
 Nostell Priory
 Oakwell Hall
 Oakwood Hall
 Oakworth Hall
 Oulton Hall
 Parlington Hall (demolished)
 Red House Museum
 Scout Hall
 Shelley Hall
 Shibden Hall
 Sowerby Hall
 Spring Hall
 Temple Newsam
 Thornhill Hall (ruined)
 Tong Hall
 Walterclough Hall
 Walton Hall
 Whitley Beaumont
 Wood Hall Country House Hotel
 Woodsome Hall
 Woolley Hall

Wiltshire

 Amesbury Abbey
 Ashcombe House
 Ashton Gifford House
 Avebury Manor & Garden
 Baynton House
 Berryfield House
 Berwick House
 Biddesden House
 Bishopstrow House
 Bolehyde Manor
 Bowood House
 Brownston House
 Chalcot House
 Charlton Park
 Clouds House
 Coleshill House
 Compton Bassett House
 Corsham Court
 Cottles House
 Devizes Castle
 Draycot House
 Ferne House
 Fonthill Abbey
 Fosbury House
 Great Chalfield Manor
 Hannington Hall
 Hartham Park
 Heale House
 Heywood House
 Hurdcott House
 Iford Manor
 Lacock Abbey
 Lake House
 Little Durnford Manor
 Littlecote House
 Longford Castle
 Longleat
 Lydiard Park
 Maiden Bradley House
 Manor House Hotel
 Melksham House
 Mompesson House
 Monkton Farleigh Manor
 Monkton House
 Neston Park
 Newhouse
 New Wardour Castle
 The Old Bell
 Philipps House
 Pythouse
 Ramsbury Manor
 Reddish House
 Rood Ashton House (largely demolished)
 Roundway House (largely demolished)
 Salthrop House
 Sheldon Manor
 South Wraxall Manor
 Southbroom House
 Stourhead
 Tedworth House
 Tilshead Lodge
 Tottenham House
 Trafalgar House
 Wardour Castle
 Westwood Manor
 Whatley Manor
 Wilton House
 Wulfhall

Worcestershire

 Abberley Hall
 Abberton Hall
 Badge Court
 Barnt Green House
 Baston Hall Farm
 Birtsmorton Court
 Bockleton Court
 Bredon Hall
 Chateau Impney
 Cleeve Prior Manor
 Cofton Hall
 Cotheridge Court
 Croome Court
 Deasland Farm
 Dowles Manor
 Evesham Abbey
 Fairfield House, Belbroughton
 Feckenham Lane House Farm
 Glasshampton (demolished)
 Grafton Manor
 Hagley Hall
 Hampton Lovett Manor House
 Hanbury Hall
 Hanley Castle
 Hartlebury Castle
 Harvington Hall
 Hewell Grange
 Hillhampton House
 Hindlip Hall
 Holmwood, Redditch
 Holt Castle, Worcestershire
 Huddington Court
 The Hyde, Stoke Bliss
 Kemerton Court
 Kyre Park
 Lickey Grange
 Madresfield Court
 Malvern Tudor House
 Maypole Cottage
 Meer Hall
 Mill Hall
 Moat House, Longdon
 New Guesten Hall
 Norgrove Court
 Ombersley Court
 Overbury Court
 Prior's Court
 Shakenhurst Hall
 Sodington Hall
 Spetchley Park
 Strensham Court  (demolished)
 Tartebigge Farm
 Thickenappletree Manor
 Tickenhill Palace
 Warndon Court
 Westwood Park
 Wickhamford Manor
 Witley Court
 Woolas Hall

Channel Islands

Guernsey

 La Fregate
 Rozel Manor
 Sausmarez Manor

Herm

 White House

Jersey

 Les Augrès Manor

Northern Ireland

Belfast

 Belfast Castle

County Antrim

 Antrim Castle and Clotworthy House
 Arthur Cottage
 Ballygally Castle
 Carrickfergus Castle
 Dundarave House
 Dunluce Castle
 Glenarm Castle
 Moneyglass House
 Sentry Hill
 Shane's Castle
 Castle Upton

County Armagh

 Ardress House
 The Argory
 Ballymoyer House (demolished)
 Castlecaulfield (ruins)
 Drumbanagher House (demolished)
 Gosford Castle
 Richhill Castle
 Tandragee Castle
 Tynan Abbey

County Down

 Bangor Castle
 Burrenwood
 Castle Ward
 Castlewellan Castle
 Clandeboye Estate
 Grey Abbey House
 Hillsborough Castle
 Killyleagh Castle
 Mount Stewart
 Quintin Castle
 Rowallane House
 Seaforde House
Waringstown House

County Fermanagh

 Castle Archdale
 Belle Isle Castle
 Castle Coole
 Colebrooke Park
 Crom Castle
 Enniskillen Castle
 Florence Court
 Necarne

County Londonderry

 Bellaghy Bawn
 Downhill House/Mussenden Temple
 Dungiven Castle
 Prehen House
 Springhill House

County Tyrone

 Baronscourt
 Benburb Castle
 Blessingbourne House
 Castle Caulfield
 Favour Royal
 Lissan House
 Parkanaur House

Scotland

Aberdeen

 Friendville

Aberdeenshire

Aberdour House
 Balbithan House
 Balmoral Castle
Birkhall
Bourtie House
 Braemar Castle
 Cairness House
 Candacraig House
 Cluny Castle
 Crimonmogate
 Duff House
 Dunecht House
 Elsick House
 Fasque House
 Fetteresso Castle
 Forglen House
 Fyvie Castle
Glas-allt-Shiel
Haddo House
Hatton Castle
House of Memsie
Leith Hall
Meldrum House
Monboddo House
Muchalls Castle
 New Slains Castle
Pitfour (demolished)
Rickarton House
Tilquhillie Castle
Ury House

Angus

 Ballumbie Castle
 Blair Castle
 Brechin Castle
 Careston Castle
 House of Dun
 Finavon Castle
 Glamis Castle
 Lundie Castle

Argyll and Bute

Ardfin
 Ardkinglas House
 Ascog House
 Balmory Hall
Colonsay House
 Duart Castle
Dunlossit House
Hafton House
 Inveraray Castle
Islay House
Kilberry Castle
 Kildalton Castle
 Kilmory Castle
 Mount Stuart House
New Castle Lachlan
St Conan's Tower
 Tiroran House
 Torosay Castle

Clackmannanshire

 Brucefield House
 Cowden Park House
 Gean House

Dumfries and Galloway

Arbigland
Ardwall House
 Cally Palace
 Craigdarroch
 Craigenputtock House
 Crawfordton House
 Drumlanrig Castle
 Earlstoun Castle
 Friar's Carse
Galloway House
Gelston Castle
 Glenlair House
 Kinmount House
 Monreith House
 Rammerscales House
Springkell house
 Terregles House

Dundee

 Camperdown House
 Dudhope Castle

East Ayrshire

 Auchinleck House
 Carnell Estate
 Dalmore House and Estate
Dumfries House
Lands of Dallars
 Sorn Castle

East Dunbartonshire

 Craigend Castle

East Lothian

 Archerfield House
 Bankton House
 Biel House
 Carberry Tower
 Elphinstone Tower
 Gosford House
 Greywalls
 Hamilton House
 Inveresk Lodge, NTS
 Keith Marischal
 Lennoxlove House
 Newhailes
 Northfield House
 Pinkie House
 Prestongrange House - Royal Musselburgh Golf Club
 Saltoun Hall
 Seton Castle
 Stevenson House
 Winton House

East Renfrewshire

 Capelrig House
 Glanderson House

Edinburgh

 Craigiehall
 Dalmeny House
 Dundas Castle
 Haltoun House
 Lauriston Castle
 Prestonfield House

Falkirk

 Callendar House
 Kinneil House

Fife

 Balcaskie
Broomhall House
 Crawford Priory (ruin)
 Earlshall Castle
 Elie House
 Falkland Palace
 Hallyards Castle
 Kellie Castle
 Leslie House
 Melville House
 Myres Castle
 Pitcairn House
 Priestfield House (demolished)
 Rossend Castle
 Tulliallan Castle

Glasgow

 Haggs Castle
 Pollok House
 Provan Hall

Highland

 Achvarasdal House
 Arisaig House, Arisaig
 Carbisdale Castle
 Cawdor Castle, Nairn
 Colonsay House
 Dunrobin Castle, Sutherland
 Dunvegan Castle, Isle of Skye
 Forss House Hotel
 Lemlair House
 Novar House

Inverclyde

 Ardgowan House
 Castle Wemyss (demolished)
 Duchal House
 Finlaystone House

Midlothian

 Arniston House
 Dalkeith Palace
 Newbattle Abbey
 Mavisbank House
 Melville Castle
 Penicuik House
 Vogrie House

Moray

 Cullen House, Cullen
 Ballindalloch Castle, Banffshire
 Darnaway Castle, nr Forres
 Gordon Castle, Fochabers
 Innes House, nr Elgin
 Thunderton House, Elgin

North Ayrshire

 Bourtreehill House
 Burnhouse Manor
 Kelburn Castle
 Kerelaw House
 Mount Stuart House

North Lanarkshire

 Cambusnethan House
 Colzium House
 Cumbernauld House
 Dalziel House

Orkney Islands

 Balfour Castle

Perth and Kinross

Ballathie House
Battleby
Blair Castle
Dalchonzie
Drumkilbo
Dunalastair Hotel
Dupplin Castle
Faskally House
Fingask Castle
Gleneagles Hotel
Killiechassie House
Kinross House
Lude House
Moncreiffe House
Ochtertyre
Rossie Priory
Scone Palace
 Stobhall
Taymouth Castle

Renfrewshire

 Blackhall Manor
 Burnhouse Manor
 Castle Semple
 Formakin House
 Parkhouse Manor

Scottish Borders

 Abbotsford House
 Ayton Castle
 Black Barony
 Bowhill House
 Chesters
 Cringletie
 Dryburgh Abbey Hotel
 Duns Castle
 Ednam House Hotel
 Floors Castle
 Kirna House (The Kirna, also Grangehill)
 Manderston
 Mellerstain House, Berwickshire
 Monteviot House, Jedburgh
 Neidpath Castle, Peeblesshire
 Paxton House
 Thirlestane Castle, Berwickshire
 Traquair House, Peeblesshire
 Wedderburn Castle

Shetland Islands

 Belmont House
 Brough Lodge
 Busta House
 Gardie House
 Lunna House
 Symbister House

South Ayrshire

 Auchans Castle
 Auchincruive
 Black Clauchrie House
 Blairquhan Castle
 Culzean Castle

South Lanarkshire

 Carstairs House
 Corehouse
 Hamilton Palace

Stirling

 Argyll's Lodging
 Gartmore House
 Strathblane Country House

West Dunbartonshire

 Balloch Castle
 Overtoun House

West Lothian

 Balbardie House (demolished)
 The Binns
 Blackburn House
 Hopetoun House
 Howden House
 Linlithgow Palace
 Polkemmet House (demolished)

Western Isles

 Amhuinnsuidhe Castle
 Ardfin Estate
 Lews Castle

Wales

Bridgend

 Bryngarw House
 Court Colman Manor
 Merthyr Mawr House

Caerphilly

 Llancaiach Fawr Manor
 Ruperra Castle

Cardiff

 Bishop's Palace
 Castell Coch
 Cardiff Castle
 Insole Court
 St Fagans Castle
 Llanrumney Hall

Carmarthenshire

 Aberglasney
 Cwmgwili
 Golden Grove
 Newton House
 Parc Howard
 Plas Llanstephan
 Plas Taliaris
 Stradey Castle
 Ty Gwyn ar Daf

Ceredigion

 Castle Green House
 Falcondale House
 Glanarberth - Demolished in 1986
 Glandyfi Castle
 Hafod House - demolished 1958
 Mabws Hall
 Nanteos Mansion
 Llanerchaeron

Conwy

 Bodysgallen Hall
 Bodnant House
 Gloddaeth Hall
 Gwydir Castle
 Gwrych Castle
 Kinmel Hall
 Plas Iolyn
 Plas Mawr

Denbighshire

 Bodelwyddan Castle
 Bodrhyddan Hall
 Brynbella
 Eriviat Hall
 Faenol Fawr
 Foxhall Newydd
 Llannerch Hall
 Llangedwyn Hall
 Ruthin Castle
 Trevor Hall
 Wigfair Hall

Flintshire

 Bettisfield Hall
 Downing Hall
 Gyrn Castle
 Hawarden Castle
 Hartsheath
 Horsley Hall
 Mostyn Hall
 Northop Hall Country House Hotel
 Soughton Hall
 Talacre Abbey

Gwynedd

 Cochwillan Old Hall
 Bryn Bras Castle
 Bodysgallen
 Glan Gwna
 Gloddaeth
 Maenan Hall
 Nannau Hall
 Penrhyn Castle
 Plas Bodegroes
 Plas Brondanw
 Plas Glynllifon
 Plas Yn Rhiw
 Vaynol

Isle of Anglesey

 Baron Hill House
 Bodorgan Hall
 Bodwyr
 Bryn Mel Manor
 Carreglwyd
 Chateau Rhianfa
 Nant yr Odyn Country Hotel
 Plas Bodewryd
 Plas Newydd
 Presaddfed Hall
 Seiont Manor Hotel
 Tre-Ysgawen Hall

Merthyr Tydfil

 Cyfarthfa Castle

Monmouthshire

 Caer Llan
 Cefntilla Court
 Clytha Castle
 Clytha Park
 Coldbrook Park (demolished)
 Croft-Y-Bwla
 Dewstow House
 Dingestow Court
 Hadnock Court
 The Hendre
 High Glanau
 Hilston Park
 Itton Court
 Llanarth Court
 Llanfair Grange
 Llantarnam Abbey
 Llanvihangel Court
 Llanwenarth House
 Mounton House
 Mathern Palace
 Newton Court
 Penhein
 Pen-y-Clawdd Court
 Piercefield House
 Shirenewton Hall
 St. Pierre Park
 Treowen
 Troy House
 Wonastow Court
 Wyelands
 Wyndcliffe Court

Neath Port Talbot

 Margam Castle

Newport

 Penhow Castle
 Tredegar House

Pembrokeshire

 Amroth Castle (ruinous)
 Carew Castle
 Castell Malgwyn
 Cresselly House
 Ffynone House
 Hênllan (demolished)
 Lamphey Court
 Orielton
 Panteg House
 Penally Abbey
 Picton Castle
 Plas Crwd (ruined)
 Sealyham House
 St. Brides Castle
 St Davids Bishops Palace
 Scolton Manor
 Slebech Park
 Sodston Manor
 Treffgarne Hall
 Trewern Mansion

Powys

 Abbey Cwmhir Hall
 Baynham Hall
 Calcott Hall
 Craig-y-Nos Castle
 Gliffaes Country House Hotel, Crickhowell
 Gregynog Hall
 Henblas
 Leighton Hall
 Lymore, (Montgomery). Demolished 1931
 Llangedwyn Hall
 Llangoed Hall
 Llysdinam
 Marrington Hall
 Maesmawr Hall
 Penoyre House
 Plas Dolguog
 Plas Machynlleth
 Porthmawr Country House, Crickhowell
 Powis Castle
 Treberfydd
 Tretower Court
 Trewern Hall

Rhondda Cynon Taf

 Castellau House
 Llanharan House
 Miskin Manor
 Talygarn Manor

Swansea

 Clyne Castle
 Kilvrough Manor, Gower
 Oxwich Castle, Gower
 Penllergaer House
 Penrice Castle, Gower
 Singleton Abbey
 Sketty Hall
 Weobley Castle, Gower

Vale of Glamorgan

 Barry Castle
 Bonvilston House
 Boverton Place
 Coedarhydyglyn
 Corntown Court
 Dimlands
 Dunraven Castle
 Dyffryn House
 Egerton Grey Country House Hotel, Barry
 Ewenny Priory
 Fonmon Castle
 Gileston Manor
 Great Frampton
 Hensol Castle
 Llandough Castle
 Llansannor Court
 Nash Manor
 Old Beaupre Castle
 Penllyn Castle
 Portobello House
 Pwllywrach
 St. Donat's Castle
 Tresillian House
 Wenvoe Castle
 Worlton Manor
 Wrinstone House

Wrexham (county borough)|Wrexham

 Acton Hall (demolished)
 Bodidris Hall
 Borras Hall
 Bronwylfa Hall
 Brynyffynnon (demolished)
 Bryn Estyn Hall
 Bryn y Pys Hall (demolished)
 Brymbo Hall (demolished)
 Bryn y Grog
 Brynkinallt
 Caergwrle Castle (ruin)
 Cefn Park
 Chirk Castle
 Croesnewydd Hall
 Darland Hall
 Erbistock Hall
 Erddig Hall
 Erlas Hall
 Esclusham Hall
 Esless Hall
 Gerwyn Hall
 Gladwyn Hall
 Gresford Lodge
 Gwastad Hall
 Gwersyllt Hall (demolished)
 Gwersyllt Hill
 Hafod y Wern House
 Horsley Hall, Gresford (demolished)
 Iscoyd Park
 Little Acton House (demolished)
 Llyndir Hall
 Llwyn Isaf (demolished)
 Llwyn Onn
 Marchwiel Hall
 Pant yr Ochain House
 Pendine Hall (demolished)
 Pen y Lan Hall
 Pentrebychan Hall (demolished)
 Pickhill Hall
 Plas Acton (demolished)
 Rossett Hall, Rossett
 Stansty Hall (demolished)
 The Mount (demolished)
 Trevalyn Hall
 Trevalyn Manor
 Wynnstay

See also

 List of hotels in the United Kingdom
 List of family seats of English nobility
 List of family seats of Welsh nobility
 List of family seats of Scottish nobility
 List of family seats of Irish nobility

References

Notes

Bibliography

External links
 A directory of over 1900 demolished country houses in the UK

 
Country houses